Geoffrey Howard Stern (5 February 1935 - 3 October 2005) was an English academic who was a Senior Lecturer in International Relations at the London School of Economics (LSE).

He was also a radio personality and presented the programmes 24 Hours and Newshour on the BBC World Service.

An expert in International Communism, he was much in demand on radio and television shows at the deaths of Brezhnev, Andropov and Chernenko and at the fall of the Berlin Wall in 1989.

Amongst the books he wrote are "Leaders and Leadership", published in 1993; "Fifty Years of Communism", published in 1967 and "The Structure of International Society", published in 1995.

Geoffrey was also a composer and as a teenager he was in fairly regular contact with composer Vaughan Williams.

His son is former "Big Brother" contestant Jonty Stern and his daughter is theatre historian Tiffany Stern.

References 
https://www.theguardian.com/news/2005/oct/19/guardianobituaries.mainsection

https://www.independent.co.uk/news/obituaries/geoffrey-stern-321362.html

https://www.classicalarchives.com/composer/74022.html

English radio presenters
1935 births
2005 deaths